The 1992 Copa Master de Supercopa Final was a football match to determine the champion of Copa Master de Supercopa, a competition played under a single-elimination basis contested by winning teams of Supercopa Libertadores. This edition was played between Argentine club Boca Juniors and Brazilian club Cruzeiro on May 31, 1992, at José Amalfitani Stadium. 

Previously, Boca Juniors had beaten Paraguayan Olimpia 1–0 while Cruzeiro had defeated Racing on penalties 3–1 after both teams tied 1–1 on regular time. Those matches were played at José Amalfitani Stadium as well.

In the final, Boca Juniors beat Cruzeiro 2–1 to claim their first Copa Master title.

Qualified teams

Final summary

References

1
 Sports competitions in Buenos Aires
m
m
1992